Gablenz is a municipality in the district of Görlitz, in Saxony, Germany.

The municipality is part of the recognized Sorbian settlement area in Saxony. Upper Sorbian has an official status next to German, all villages bear names in both languages.

See also 
Räderschnitza

References 

Municipalities in Saxony
Populated places in Görlitz (district)